Veafjorden (historically, the Vedåfjorden) is a fjord in Vestland county, Norway. There is one bridge across the fjord, the Kallestadsundet Bridge near Stamneshella.

A scene from the movie "The Golden Compass" was filmed along the Veafjorden.

See also
 List of Norwegian fjords

References

Fjords of Vestland
Vaksdal
Osterøy